Acanthinucella spirata is a species of predatory sea snail, a marine gastropod mollusk in the family Muricidae, the murex snails or rock snails.

Distribution
A. spirata occurs on the West Coast aka the Pacific Ocean coast of North America.

Description

Human use
This species is known to have been exploited by some Native Americans such as the Chumash of Central California approximately 1000 to 1200 AD.

References

External links

 

Ocenebrinae
Gastropods described in 1832